Dunbar-Broadway is a neighborhood in southeast Baltimore, Maryland, USA. The area includes part of the Johns Hopkins Hospital campus, and recent development in the area has been driven by its proximity to the institution.

References

Neighborhoods in Baltimore
Southeast Baltimore